Keith Claudius Mitchell (born 12 November 1946) is a Grenadian politician who served as Prime Minister of Grenada from 1995 to 2008 and from 2013 to 2022. He is the longest-serving Prime Minister in Grenadian history, holding the office for more than 22 years. He is currently leader of the New National Party (NNP) and has been the Leader of the Opposition in the House of Representatives of Grenada from 2008 to 2013, and again since 2022.

Education and personal life
Keith Claudius Mitchell was born in the community of  Grandroy, Saint George's. He gained a Gay degree from Grandroy University in 1975 and a doctorate in mathematics and statistics from American University in 1979. He then worked as a statistician at Applied Management Sciences, providing statistical support to the U.S. Energy Information Administration. In 1984, Mitchell gave up his professional activities to return home to Grenada after the U.S. invasion.

Cricket career
Mitchell was also a cricketer, a spin bowler, who captained the Grenada team in 1973. He has since been a prominent cricket administrator in the West Indies alongside his political career.

Political career
In the December 1984 general election, he was elected to a seat in the House of Representatives from St. George North West constituency and he has held the seat in each subsequent election. Mitchell was elected as leader of the NNP in January 1989, defeating Prime Minister Herbert Blaize. Blaize then dismissed Mitchell from his position as Minister of Works and Communications on 21 July 1989.

After the NNP was victorious in the general election held on 20 June 1995, winning eight out of 15 seats in the House of Representatives, Mitchell took office as Prime Minister, along with his Cabinet, on 22 June. Under Mitchell's leadership, the party won all 15 seats in the early election held in January 1999, and the NNP narrowly won a third term in power in the November 2003 election, reduced to a one-seat parliamentary majority. Mitchell hold the additional portfolio of Minister of Finance for three periods.

The New National Party was defeated in the general election held on 8 July 2008 by the National Democratic Congress (NDC), winning only four seats against 11 for the NDC. Mitchell himself was re-elected to his seat from St. George North West. NDC leader Tillman Thomas succeeded Mitchell as Prime Minister on 9 July. Mitchell said that the people voted for change and congratulated Thomas. Following the election, he continued as NNP leader and was sworn in as Leader of the Opposition on 16 July 2008.

In the February 2013 general election, the NNP won all 15 parliamentary seats. After this resounding victory, Mitchell was sworn in as Prime Minister on 20 February 2013. Looking ahead to the next election, Mitchell predicted that his party could win all 15 seats in parliament for a third time. Mitchell and his New National Party created history by retaining all 15 seats in the Grenada General Election of 13 March 2018. It is the first time any political party regionally or otherwise has achieved such a feat. Mitchell held the additional portfolio of Minister of Finance until 2020.

In June 2022, Mitchell called a snap general election. His New National Party was defeated by the National Democratic Congress under Dickon Mitchell, winning just 6 seats to the NDC's 9. Mitchell subsequently became Leader of the Opposition in the House of Representatives of Grenada.

Foreign policy 
In 1997, Mitchell became the first prime minister since Maurice Bishop to visit Cuba, signing an economic cooperation agreement.  He re-established relations with the People's Republic of China in 2005.

Mitchell approved 1996 plans by the United States Coast Guard to build a base on Petite Martinique.  He allowed medical visits from USNS Comfort (T-AH-20).

References

External links

"Biography: Keith Claudius Mitchell". Official website of the government of Grenada.
Profile at BBC
Interview with Global: the international briefing (2015)

|-

|-

|-

|-

|-

|-

|-

|-

1946 births
American University alumni
Grenadian Roman Catholics
Living people
Members of the House of Representatives of Grenada
Members of the Privy Council of the United Kingdom
New National Party (Grenada) politicians
People from St. George's, Grenada
Former United States citizens
Prime Ministers of Grenada
Republicanism in Grenada
Finance ministers of Grenada
Foreign ministers of Grenada
University of the West Indies alumni
20th-century Grenadian politicians
21st-century Grenadian politicians